Joseph Patrick Murphy (born October 16, 1967) is a Canadian former professional hockey player who was chosen first overall in the 1986 NHL Entry Draft. Murphy won Calder Cup and NCAA championships before reaching the NHL.

Although Murphy struggled to make the expected impact after being selected first overall by the Detroit Red Wings, he was traded to the Edmonton Oilers in 1989. His production began to increase significantly in the 1990 playoffs to help Edmonton win their fifth Stanley Cup in seven seasons, and this success continued through his time in Edmonton. A contract dispute led to a trade to the Chicago Blackhawks in 1993, where he remained very productive. Murphy's later years were spent with the St. Louis Blues, San Jose Sharks, Boston Bruins, and Washington Capitals.

Playing career

Detroit Red Wings 

Joe Murphy became the first NCAA college player to be selected first overall when he was selected in the 1986 NHL Entry Draft by the Detroit Red Wings.  Murphy had been a stand out centre with Michigan State, but with Steve Yzerman and Adam Oates handling the first and second line duties in Detroit, Murphy found little room to develop his game with the Red Wings.  He spent the bulk of his rookie pro season in the American Hockey League with the Wings farm club in Adirondack.

The following season Murphy split time between the AHL and the NHL playing fifty games with Detroit after converting to right wing.  He managed just ten goals and 19 points and ended up back in the minor leagues for the majority of the 1988-89 season where he really found his game putting up 31 goals and 66 points in just 47 games.  That spring Murphy played a key role for the Adirondack Red Wings capturing the Calder Cup to complete his breakout pro season.  The next season, 1989–90, Murphy scored three goals in the first nine games of the season for the Red Wings. He was then shipped to the Edmonton Oilers as part of a blockbuster six-player trade that landed Jimmy Carson and Kevin McClelland with the Red Wings and sent Murphy, Adam Graves, Petr Klíma and Jeff Sharples to Edmonton.

Edmonton Oilers and Chicago Blackhawks 

With the Oilers, Murphy joined a young and up-and-coming core, but his development seemed to stall with just seven goals and 25 points in 62 games. However, that spring, in the playoffs, he found another gear. Coach John Muckler put Murphy with Adam Graves and Martin Gelinas on a line dubbed the "Kid Line" (Murphy and Graves were 21 while Gelinas was just 19) where he enjoyed great success, putting up 14 points in 22 playoff games and providing solid secondary scoring for the Oilers en route to a Stanley Cup triumph over the Boston Bruins. "They put our line together about the third game of the playoffs and all I recall is us just saying ‘Let’s go out there and work hard,’ Gelinas said of the 1990 Cup team. "Murph had a lot of skill and Gravy was the big, heavy guy. All three of us combined created a pretty good energy and a big buzz. We got some timely goals, but more importantly when we were on the ice we were just making things happen".

Murphy built on this success the next year scoring 27 goals and 62 points then improved again the following year with career-best totals of 35 goals and 82 points.  That spring Murphy led the surprising Oilers all the way to the Conference Finals where they fell to Chicago but Murphy's team leading 24 points in just 16 playoff games saw him finish fourth in post season scoring despite his team not playing in the final round. The breakthrough offensive totals came at the right time for Murphy whose contract expired following the season.  Murphy and Oilers General Manager Glen Sather tried to work out a new contract through the summer with no success and ultimately broke off talks in September, before training camp with the two sides $300,000 apart. With Murphy holding out, the 1992-93 season went on with him working out with the Detroit Falcons of the Colonial Hockey League and awaiting a trade that wouldn't come until February.

Murphy was dealt to the Chicago Blackhawks and given a new three-year contract with an option year, joining the club for the final 19 games of the season, posting 7 goals and 17 points. His first full season in Chicago, the 1993-94 campaign, saw Murphy pot 31 goals and 70 points, which would prove to be his best year with the Blackhawks. The following year Murphy led the Hawks in goals with 23, and posted 41 points in 40 games in a lockout-shortened season.

In 1995-96 he scored 24 goals, just one more than the previous season despite playing 30 more games, and dipped to 51 points in 70 games, well off his point-a-game pace of the previous season. Perhaps more concerning was the fact he was one of only two forwards — the other being tough guy Jim Cummins — to finish the year with a negative plus/minus rating. With wingers Tony Amonte and Eric Daze eclipsing him as the primary scoring wings, Chicago did not renew his contract when it expired that spring.

St. Louis Blues and San Jose Sharks 

On July 3, 1996, Murphy signed a 3-year, $10 million deal to join the St. Louis Blues but after scoring 20-goals and 45 points he fell short of the lofty expectations that came with his new contract. The next season, he posted just four goals and 13 points in 29 games before the Blues traded him to the San Jose Sharks for defensemen Todd Gill. Because of his large contract, the Blues also needed to send cash to San Jose in the transaction to get the deal done.

With the Sharks, Murphy rebounded and put up 9 points in ten games then led the team with 25 goals the following year and finished second on the team with 48 points.  Despite his success, he left the team as a free agent in the off-season and was unable to find any takers.

Late career turmoil 
The off-season came and went with Murphy not finding work before he eventually managed to land a try-out with the New York Rangers in November 1999. Rangers General Manager Neil Smith had been the GM of Adirondack when Murphy played for the club so the two had some history. However the tryout was very short lived as Murphy signed a contract with the Boston Bruins less than a week after beginning his try out with the Rangers. The Rangers, who weren't offered a chance to match the offer, felt spurned in the situation and Murphy made bizarre accusations about his sticks being partially sawed in half and one of his skates being "thrown in the river" by Smith.

Things in Boston didn't go much better for Murphy. He lasted just 26 games with the Bruins before the team suspended him indefinitely for "screaming profanities at coach Pat Burns." Murphy made few friends in the Bruins locker room and was said to have questioned his teammates' work ethic and was known to tell off both teammates and the coaching staff. "This has been going on for a while," Burns said at the time of the suspension. "The players have had enough and I have had enough." The Bruins, unable to find a team willing to trade for Murphy, placed the winger on waivers where he was claimed by the Washington Capitals.

With Washington, Murphy was given a very short leash. Team officials did their due diligence speaking with former coaches and teammates of Murphy before making the claim and General Manager George McPhee said if Murphy caused any issues with team he would be shipped out immediately. Murphy played 43 games with Washington over the next two years before ending his career on a particularly low note. Murphy, who had just one goal and six points in 14 games to start the 2000-01 season, was involved in an altercation in New York. After a team dinner and a trip to a night club, Murphy tried to talk a woman into joining him in a limo. She refused and a fight ensued which led to the woman's male companion striking Murphy in the head with a bottle.

The following day the Capitals assigned Murphy to their American Hockey League affiliate.  Murphy refused to report and was suspended by the team and never played professional hockey again. Murphy tried — and failed — to file for workers compensation because the incident happened while he was traveling for work. The Department of Employment Services ruled that while Murphy was in New York for work reasons and the dinner was a team event, the bar Murphy traveled to after the dinner had nothing to do with his employment. Murphy appealed the decision and lost.

Post-retirement life
In 2013, Murphy became the first coach and general manager of the GMHL Alliston Coyotes in their inaugural, 2013–14 season. However, he took a leave of absence from the team midway through the playoffs due to an undisclosed allegation which resulted in a Trespass Order issued against him by the Town of New Tecumseth, Ontario.
On March 5, 2014, Murphy formally announced his resignation.

In 2017, Murphy was living in Costa Rica. He ended up living on the streets and was eventually deported back to Canada.

On July 6, 2018, Murphy visited the studios of Q104 / KenoraOnline and DrydenNow to talk about his struggles with post-concussion symptoms, as well as his participation in the class action lawsuit with the NHL. He acknowledged that despite earning over $15 million during his NHL career, he was essentially homeless and destitute in Kenora, Ontario. Murphy further elaborated upon his situation in "Finding Murph", a SportsCentre feature that aired in August 2018. The segment's creators, Josh Shiaman, Rick Westhead, Stuart Roberts, Devon Burns and Michael Banani, received a Canadian Screen Award nomination for Best Sports Feature Segment at the 7th Canadian Screen Awards.

In October 2018, the Detroit Free Press reported that Murphy was still homeless in Kenora. The report stated that his situation was caused by multiple concussions resulting in symptoms of frequent headaches, wild mood swings, and personality changes, including becoming an enforcer, starting to take drugs and alcohol. That same month, the CTV News television program W5 produced a segment following two reporters from sister-network The Sports Network, as they looked in on Murphy, who admitted he had been living in shelters and tents around Ontario, where much of his earnings in the NHL had once been donated to various projects.

In March 2019, Murphy completed treatment through the Adult Mental Health Services (AMHS) live-in program at the Thunder Bay Regional Health Sciences Centre. In August 2019, USA Today reported Murphy was once again homeless in Kenora and "refusing help". In the summer of 2020, Murphy was living on the streets of Regina, Saskatchewan.

Career statistics

Regular season and playoffs

International

Awards and achievements
 1985-86 - NCAA - NCAA Championship (Michigan State)
 1988–89 - AHL - Calder Cup (Adirondack)
 1989–90 - NHL - Stanley Cup (Edmonton)

References

External links
 

1967 births
Living people
Adirondack Red Wings players
Boston Bruins players
Canadian ice hockey right wingers
Chicago Blackhawks players
Detroit Red Wings draft picks
Detroit Red Wings players
Edmonton Oilers players
Ice hockey people from Ontario
Michigan State Spartans men's ice hockey players
National Hockey League first-overall draft picks
Penticton Knights players
St. Louis Blues players
San Jose Sharks players
Sportspeople from London, Ontario
Stanley Cup champions
Washington Capitals players
National Hockey League first-round draft picks
NCAA men's ice hockey national champions